Lukman Iqbal Meriwala (born 11 December 1991) is an Indian cricketer who plays for Baroda in domestic cricket. He is a left-arm fast-medium bowler who was the leading wicket-taker of the 2013/14 Syed Mushtaq Ali Trophy which Baroda won. In February 2021, Meriwala was bought by the Delhi Capitals in the IPL auction ahead of the 2021 Indian Premier League.

References

External links

 
 

1991 births
Living people
Indian cricketers
Baroda cricketers